This is a list of primary and secondary school tests.

Tests available at the end of secondary school, like Regents Examinations in New York, California High School Exit Exam, GED across North America, GCE A-Level in the UK, might lead to a school-leaving certificate(diploma). However, other tests like SAT and ACT do not play such roles.

Africa
Uganda Advanced Certificate of Education

Americas
General Educational Development (GED)
Advanced Placement Program
SAT
PSAT
ACT (test)
PLAN (test)
California High School Exit Exam – California
Connecticut Academic Performance Test – Connecticut
Connecticut Mastery Test – Connecticut
Florida Comprehensive Assessment Test (FCAT) – Florida
Commonwealth Accountability Testing System (CATS) – Kentucky
High School Proficiency Assessment – New Jersey
Indiana Statewide Testing for Educational Progress (ISTEP) – Indiana
Regents Examinations – New York
Michigan Merit Exam – Michigan
Massachusetts Comprehensive Assessment System – Massachusetts
State of Texas Assessment of Academic Readiness (STAAR) – Texas
Tennessee Comprehensive Assessment Program (TCAP)  – Tennessee
Ohio Graduation Test – Ohio
Pennsylvania System of School Assessment – Pennsylvania
Standards of Learning – Virginia
Washington Assessment of Student Learning – Washington
Georgia High School Graduation Test – Georgia
Colorado Student Assessment Program (CSAPs) – Colorado
HSPT – High School Placement Test

for Admission
SHSAT – Specialized High Schools Admissions Test for New York City
ISEE – Independent School Entrance Examination
SSAT – Secondary School Admission Test
TACHS – Test for Admission into Catholic High Schools (New York City, Long Island, Westchester)

Asia
All India Senior School Certificate Examination - the final examination conducted every year for seniors secondary school students by the Central Board of Secondary Education on behalf of the Government of India.
Sijil Tinggi Persekolahan Malaysia – Malaysian Higher School Certificate is a test usually taken by students at the end of Form 6
UPSR – Entrance test into Secondary Schools for Malaysia
HKCEE – Hong Kong Certificate of Education Examination. Taken by Form 5 students. Also used for sixth form admission, which competition is fierce, and not many students can have sixth form education.
HKALE – Hong Kong Advanced Level Examination. An additional test to be by students whose finished sixth form 2 years after HKCEE. Used for university admission.
PSLE – Entrance test into Secondary Schools for Singapore
OKS – Entrance test into Secondary Schools for Turkey
National High School Graduation Examination  – Vietnam

Europe
CITO Toets – The Netherlands
Common Entrance Examination – For entry into public schools in the UK
Eleven-plus – For entry to grammar schools in the UK
European Baccalaureate
International Baccalaureate Diploma
GCE A-level – England, Wales and Northern Ireland
AQA Baccalaureate
Access to HE Diploma
Welsh Baccalaureate
Scottish Higher/Advanced Higher – Scotland
Cambridge Pre-U Diploma
Leaving Certificate (Árdteistiméireacht) – the Republic of Ireland
Abitur – Germany
Baccalauréat – France
Selectividad – Spain
Maturità – Italy
Matura – Austria, Poland

Oceania
Higher School Certificate – New South Wales External Assessment
Victorian Certificate of Education/Victorian Certificate of Applied Learning
Queensland Certificate of Education
South Australian Certificate of Education
Western Australian Certificate of Education
Tasmanian Certificate of Education
Australian Capital Territory Year 12 Certificate
Northern Territory Certificate of Education
National Certificate of Educational Achievement – New Zealand Assessment

See also
List of secondary school leaving qualifications
List of admission tests to colleges and universities

School examinations
Standardized tests